Turukhansk is a rural locality (a selo) and the administrative center of Turukhansky District of Krasnoyarsk Krai, Russia, located  north of Krasnoyarsk, at the confluence of the Yenisey and Nizhnyaya Tunguska Rivers.

History
One of the first Russian settlements in Siberia, Turukhansk was founded in 1607 as a winter camp for Cossacks and merchants. After the disastrous fires of Mangazeya in 1619, 1642, and 1662, Turukhansk welcomed a large portion of the older colony's population and became known as New Mangazeya. A timber fort with cannons was built there in 1677. The settlement hosted one of the largest fairs in Siberia and was incorporated as an uyezd town of Turukhansk in 1785. The town declined after 1822.

In the Russian Empire and the Soviet Union Turukhansk was often used as a destination for political exile. Among people exiled there were Julius Martov, Yakov Sverdlov, Joseph Stalin, Lev Kamenev, Alexander Ulanovsky, Marina Tsvetaeva's daughter Ariadna Èfron, Yuz Aleshkovsky and Archbishop Luka Voyno-Yasenetsky.

Demographics
 
 
 
200 (1897).

Transportation
The town is served by the Turukhansk Airport.

Climate
The climate of Turukhansk is classified as continental subarctic (Dfc) in the Köppen climate classification system and as continental sub-arctic (taiga) with mild summers and severely cold winters (ECld) in the Trewartha climate classification system.

References

Rural localities in Turukhansky District
Yeniseysk Governorate
Populated places established in 1607
Populated places of Arctic Russia
Road-inaccessible communities of Krasnoyarsk Krai
Populated places on the Yenisei River